The Nobel Ice Egg, sometimes also referred to as the Snowflake egg, is a jewelled Fabergé egg made under the supervision of the Russian jeweller Peter Carl Fabergé for the Swedish-Russian oil baron and industrialist Emanuel Nobel between 1913 and 1914.  Unlike many of the eggs made in Fabergé's workshop, this egg is not considered an "imperial" egg as it was not given by a Russian Tsar to any Tsarina.

Design
The pearl-colored ground of the shell is covered with white enamel in alternating transparent and opaque layers each painted and engraved separately to resemble frost, the result is the icy opalescence of a winter morning. The egg, without support, lies on its side and opens in half along the greater perimeter, on the edges there is a row of beads. It lacks the realism of the Winter Egg which, however, shares the inspiration and technique in the execution of the hinges inside the jagged edges. It was designed by Alma Theresia Pihl as was the Winter Egg.

Surprise

Inside there is a watch pendant, the dial is partly hidden by decorations in the shape of ice crystals placed on the case, made of opalescent rock crystal.

History
Franz Birbaum, Fabergé's head workmaster, recalls that Emanuel Nobel "was so generous in his presents that at times it seemed that this was his chief occupation and delight. Orders were constantly being made for him in the workshops and from time to time he came to have a look at them. Often he only decided for whom the present should be when the work was finished."

After the Russian Revolution, it was sold to the Parisian dealer A. A. Anatra, who subsequently sold it to Jacques Zolotnitzky, of A La Vieille Russie, in Paris. It was later sold to a North-American collector.

In 1994, it was sold at Christie's, in Geneva, for $220,000.

The Nobel Ice egg's current owner are Artie and Dorothy McFerrin of Houston. It is on loan at the Houston Museum of Natural Science.

References

Notes

 H.C. Bainbridge, Peter Carl Fabergé (London, 1949) p. 58
 Birbaum, Franz, Memoirs, in St. Petersburg, The State Hermitage Museum, Fabergé: Imperial Jeweller (1993) p. 454)
 Habsburg-Lothringen, Geza von, and Solodkoff, Alexander von, Fabergé Joaillier à la Cour de Russie (Fribourg, 1979) pp. 108, 118, 158, pl.141, p. 120, cat.69
 Snowman, A. Kenneth, The Art of Carl Fabergé (London, 1964) p. 113, pl.387
 
 Solodkoff, Alexander von, Fabergé (London, 1988) p. 47

External links

 Miek's Fabergé Eggs Retrieved on 2016-05-29
 Vivian Swift, Alma Pihl's Designs for Fabergé in Magazine Antiques (Jan 1996) Retrieved on 2009-04-28

Fabergé eggs
1914 works
Fabergé clock eggs